This is a list of mosques in Cyprus.

See also
 Islam in Cyprus

References

External links

 Greek Cypriot and Turkish Cypriot Religious buildings Built before 1974
 Whatson North Cyprus

 
Mosques
Cyprus